The Holston River is a  river that flows from Kingsport, Tennessee, to Knoxville, Tennessee.  Along with its three major forks (North Fork, Middle Fork and South Fork), it comprises a major river system that drains much of northeastern Tennessee, southwestern Virginia, and northwestern North Carolina.  The Holston's confluence with the French Broad River at Knoxville marks the beginning of the Tennessee River.

The Middle Fork flows  from near the western border of Wythe County, Virginia, joining the South Fork in Washington County, Virginia, southeast of Abingdon. The Watauga River, a tributary of the South Fork Holston, flows  westward from Watauga County, North Carolina.

The main stem of the Holston is impounded by the Tennessee Valley Authority's Cherokee Dam near Jefferson City, Tennessee. Five other dams, also managed by TVA, impound the Holston's headwater streams: Watauga Dam and Wilbur Dam on the Watauga River, and Boone Dam, Fort Patrick Henry Dam, and South Holston Dam, on the South Fork Holston River.

Power generation 
The Holston River valley has been greatly developed for electrical power generation, both with hydroelectric dams and coal-fired steam plants.  In the upper reaches, some of these plants are controlled by private interests; in the downstream portion, they are owned by the United States Government's Tennessee Valley Authority.

Area 
Among the dams and associated reservoirs on the South Fork Holston River are Boone Dam and Boone Lake, named for the explorer Daniel Boone; Fort Patrick Henry Dam and Fort Patrick Henry Lake, named for the Revolutionary War hero; and South Holston Dam and South Holston Lake.

Cherokee Dam on the Holston River forms Cherokee Lake, named for the historic Native Americans who occupied extensive areas along the Holston River at the time of European-American settlement. The United States settlers and army fought with the Cherokee over land in Tennessee, North Carolina, and further South into Georgia and Alabama. In the 1830s the government forced the Cherokee out on the Trail of Tears to Indian Territory (now Oklahoma) west of the Mississippi River, under the authority of the Indian Removal Act passed by Congress in 1830.

Name 

Maps by early French explorers in this area identified what is now known as the Holston River as the "Cherokee River", after the tribe they encountered. Early Tennessee historian and Tennessee Supreme Court Justice John Haywood cited in his 1823 book The civil and political history of the state of Tennessee from its earliest settlement up to the year 1796, including the boundaries of the state that the Holston River was identified and named on earlier produced French maps as the "Cherokee River".

British colonists later named the Holston River after pioneer Stephen Holstein, a European-American settler who built a cabin in 1746 on the upper reaches of the river. Similarly, Holston Mountain was named after the Holston River.

Recreation

All three forks in Virginia, South Holston Lake, and the Holston River in Tennessee below the South Holston Dam offer relatively easy-to-reach recreation opportunities. The North Fork in Virginia is known as an excellent smallmouth bass river (due to mercury contamination, fish caught in the North Fork of the Holston below Saltville, Virginia must not be consumed).  Both the South Fork in Virginia and the first  of the Holston in Tennessee below South Holston Dam are quality brown trout and rainbow trout fisheries.  The Holston River is wide and open enough to allow extensive fly fishing. South Holston Lake offers a variety of fishing opportunity as well, as it contains smallmouth bass, common carp, walleye, pike, sunfish, crappie and a few trout.

List of crossings

Holston River
The following is a list of major road crossings on the Holston River:

South Fork Holston River
The following is a list of major road crossings on the South Fork Holston River:

North Fork Holston River

Middle Fork Holston River

The following is a list of major road crossings on the Middle Fork Holston River:

See also
List of Tennessee rivers
List of Virginia rivers
Watauga River
Doe River
Saltville, Virginia

References

External links

 
Rivers of Tennessee
Rivers of Virginia
Rivers of Bland County, Virginia
Rivers of Wythe County, Virginia
Rivers of Grainger County, Tennessee
Rivers of Washington County, Tennessee
Rivers of Knox County, Tennessee
Rivers of Sullivan County, Tennessee
Rivers of Smyth County, Virginia